Tom McGillis is a Canadian writer, producer, and the president of Fresh TV Inc.

Early life
McGillis is the son of Donald and Marguerite McGillis.

Career
Along with partner Jennifer Pertsch, he was the creator and executive producer of the animated series 6teen, Total Drama, and its first spin-off series Total Drama Presents: The Ridonculous Race, Stoked, and non-animated show My Babysitter's a Vampire. He is also one of the executive producers of  Stoked and Grojband.

Awards
In 2007, 6teen won the Alliance for Children and Television's "Award of Excellence, Animation" for programming for children, ages 9–14, and in 2008 McGillis and his team received a Gemini Award nomination for best animated program or series for Total Drama Island.

References

External links
Fresh TV Inc.'s homepage

Living people
Canadian television producers
Year of birth missing (living people)